Penianthus is a genus of flowering plants belonging to the family Menispermaceae.

Its native range is Western and Western Central Tropical Africa.

Species:

Penianthus camerounensis 
Penianthus longifolius 
Penianthus zenkeri

References

Menispermaceae
Menispermaceae genera